Victor Bernier (born 26 June 2004) is a French racing driver who is set to race in the Formula Regional European Championship with MP Motorsport, having previously competed with FA Racing.

Career

Karting 
Bernier began karting competitively in 2013, and won a number of national championships before becoming the Junior Karting World Champion in 2018, ahead of Gabriele Minì and Gabriel Bortoleto. He received a Volant d'Or award from the French Federation of Automobile Sport as a reward for his karting exploits.

Formula 4

2019 

Bernier made his car racing debut in 2019, competing in the French F4 series at the age of 14, meaning that he became one of the series' junior drivers along with Isack Hadjar and Paul-Adrien Pallot. His season started out modestly, as he would only score three top ten finishes in the first two rounds at Nogaro and Pau, however he would take the first podium of his single-seater career at the following event at Spa-Francorchamps with a P3 finish in the first race. Bernier's results improved steadily from there, as he was able to finish in the top five and on the podium more consistently, which ultimately culminated in a win at the final round of the season, where he scored a podium in each of the three races. He finished the season fourth in the FFSA Academy points standings and took a dominant title in the Juniors' championship.

2020 
For the 2020 season Bernier moved to R-ace GP to contest the ADAC Formula 4 Championship, where he would partner Kirill Smal. He scored two victories, both in the reversed-grid races at the Hockenheimring and Lausitzring respectively, and finished fifth in the championship, ahead of his teammate. In addition, Bernier took part in the third round of that year's Italian F4 series, scoring a single point.

2021 

The following year the Frenchman remained with the team for a second assault at the German championship, this time driving with compatriots Sami Meguetounif and Marcus Amand. Bernier generally beat his teammates over the race weekends, and took a sole win in Hockenheim after the original winner Ollie Bearman had received a penalty for causing a collision. He ended his final season in Formula 4 with four podiums and a fourth place in the overall results.

Formula Regional

2022 

In 2022 Bernier progressed to the Formula Regional level, racing in the Formula Regional European Championship for FA Racing alongside French F4 champion Esteban Masson and Colombian Nicolás Baptiste.

2023 
Bernier switched to MP Motorsport for the 2023 Formula Regional European Championship.

Personal life 
Bernier is currently studying in his final year of the Lycée, the equivalent to A-Levels in France. He lives and studies together with his former F4 teammate Sami Meguetounif.

On arrival to FA Racing, the raceteam set up by two-time Formula One World Champion Fernando Alonso, Bernier stated that Alonso had always been an example to him.

Bernier's younger brother Augustin is also a racing driver, who became the French Karting Champion in the OK-Junior class in 2021.

Racing record

Racing career summary 

* Season still in progress.

Complete French F4 Juniors' Championship results 
(key) (Races in bold indicate pole position) (Races in italics indicate fastest lap)

Complete French F4 Championship results 
(key) (Races in bold indicate pole position) (Races in italics indicate fastest lap)

Complete ADAC Formula 4 Championship results 
(key) (Races in bold indicate pole position) (Races in italics indicate fastest lap)

Complete Formula Regional European Championship results 
(key) (Races in bold indicate pole position) (Races in italics indicate fastest lap)

* Season still in progress.

References

External links 
 
 

2004 births
Living people
French racing drivers
French F4 Championship drivers
ADAC Formula 4 drivers
Italian F4 Championship drivers
Formula Regional European Championship drivers
FA Racing drivers
MP Motorsport drivers
R-ace GP drivers
Karting World Championship drivers